Lehri tribe  is a Baloch tribe in Balochistan, Pakistan. They are descended from the Rind Baloch and have emerged from the Domki tribe. 

The Lehris originally had their headquarters in Narmuk, Kalat District. They are spread in and around, Sibi, Dadar, Usta Mohammad, Mastung, Kalat, Kachhi District and Quetta.

History 
During Mir Abdullah Khan Wai's rule Sardar Kakkar Khan Haibatzai Lehri Baloch lost his life in Bibi Nani whilst fighting the Kalhora tribe from Kachhi District The Kalhora were forced to leave Kachhi District when a retaliatory attack was launched on them by a collection of Baloch tribes (Battle of Kachhi). 

Sardar Mir Jahangir Khan Lehri Baloch actively assisted the Khan of Kalat (Mir Khudaidad Khan) in controlling rebels in Kadh region of Mastung and lost his life in the process. After his death Sardar Mir Dost Mohammad Khan Lehri supervised the tribe until his decease in the year 1905. Sardar Mir Dost Mohammad Lehri was succeeded by Sardar Mir Mohammad Bahram Khan who was well loved and respected by the Lehris as well as Baloch from other tribes.

In the past, the Lehris were mostly land owners; agriculture being the main means of their livelihoods. They have an estimated population of about 113,000 in Balochistan.

References

Brahui tribes
Baloch tribes
Social groups of Pakistan